WXMC (1310 AM "Radio Zindagi") is a radio station licensed to Parsippany-Troy Hills, New Jersey, which signed on in 1982 under its current call-letters. The station is currently owned by Cantico Nuevo Ministry, Inc. broadcasting an Indian and South Asian radio format.

History
The station's first incarnation on the 1310 AM frequency was as WQTK in the late 1960s. The station offered a Top 40 format and was a daytime-only radio station, authorized to operate from local sunrise to  local sunset. The station became WBIO and offered an adult contemporary format. The station began to have financial problems in 1979 and in 1981 it closed.

The station was sold and became WXMC (Crossroads of Morris County) in October 1982. The station then offered a traditional big band and adult standards format playing the hits of the 1930s and 1940s wilt some very traditional standards from the 1950s and a handful of non rock songs from the late 1950s and early 1960s. The station still had financial problems and closed again in May 1983. The station was again sold and put back on the air in March 1984. At that point the station offered an adult contemporary music format.

After more financial problems, WXMC changed to a standards format called Music of Your Life in January 1985. The station played the hits of the 1930s, 1940s and early 1950s, as well as non-rock songs from the 1950s, 1960s and 1970s. The station also played a limited amount of "soft rock". Under this format, the station prospered and received high ratings. The station was successful until it was sold in 1989. By the end of 1990, financial problems again set in and, in 1991, it even lost its phone service. That spring, the station went into receivership and an effort was made to keep the station afloat. Phone service was restored but financial difficulties continued to plague the station. WXMC was sold again in summer 1992.

That fall, WXMC moved into an adult contemporary format. In summer 1993, WXMC began selling airtime for infomercials and fortune tellers. By 1995, the station was brokered full-time. It also began to remain on the air 24 hours a day. In January 1996, the station was sold and changed to a Spanish adult contemporary format, evolving into a tropical format a few years later. In September 2013, the station was sold to World India Radio for $30,000. In October 2018, it was announced that World India Radio was selling WXMC-1310 and translator W232CY (94.3) to Cantico Neuvo Ministry for $781,000. The sale was consummated on February 22, 2019.

External links

   	 	
 

XMC